Marinus Frans (Frans) Kaashoek (born 1965, Leiden) is a Dutch computer scientist, entrepreneur, and Charles Piper Professor at the Massachusetts Institute of Technology.

He was elected a member of the National Academy of Engineering (2006) for contributions to computer systems, distributed systems, and content-distribution networks.

Biography 
Kaashoek received his MA in 1988 and his Ph.D degree in Computer Science in 1992 from the Vrije Universiteit under the supervision of Andy Tanenbaum for the thesis "Group communication in distributed computer systems."

In 1993 Kaashoek was appointed Charles Piper Professor in the Department of Electrical Engineering and Computer Science of the Massachusetts Institute of Technology. He is a member of the MIT Computer Science and Artificial Intelligence Laboratory's Parallel and Distributed Operating Systems group.

Kaashoek was one of a handful of researchers awarded the NSF National Young Investigator award in 1994 and the ACM-Infosys Foundation Award in 2010. In 2004 he was elected ACM Fellow, and in 2006 he became a member of the NAE.

Work 
Kaashoek's research interest are in the fields of "computer systems: operating systems, networking, programming languages, compilers, and computer architecture for distributed, mobile, and parallel systems."

In 1998 Kaashoek co-founded SightPath, a software company that developed software products for digital distribution. It was acquired by Cisco Systems in 2000. In the early 2000s Kaashoek assisted in the founding of Mazu Networks Inc. and served as board member until it was acquired by Riverbed Technology in 2009.

Publications 
 1992. Group communication in distributed computer systems
 2009. Principles of Computer System Design: An Introduction. With Jerome H. Saltzer.

Articles
 M. Frans Kaashoek, Robbert van Renesse, Hans van Staveren and Andrew S. Tanenbaum (1993). FLIP: an internetwork protocol for supporting distributed systems ACM Transactions on Computer Systems 11:73–106.

References

External links 
 M Frans Kaashoek at MIT
 Frans Kaashoek at CSAIL

1963 births
Living people
Dutch computer scientists
Vrije Universiteit Amsterdam alumni
MIT School of Engineering faculty
People from Leiden
Recipients of the ACM Prize in Computing